Priscilla Lopez (born February 26, 1948) is an American singer, dancer, and actress. She is perhaps best known for creating the role of Diana Morales in A Chorus Line.  She has had the distinction of appearing in two Broadway landmarks: one of its greatest hits, the highly acclaimed, long-running A Chorus Line, and, as a teenager, in one of its biggest flops, the infamous musical version of Breakfast at Tiffany's, which closed before opening night.

Early life
Lopez was born in the Bronx, New York to Francisco Lopez, a hotel banquet foreman and Laura (née Candelaria), who had moved to New York from their native Puerto Rico.<ref>[http://www.nj.com/entertainment/arts/index.ssf/2008/02/from_priscilla_lopez_the_lowdo.html From Priscilla Lopez, the lowdown on 'In the Heights'''] from www.nj.com 28 February 2008</ref>

Career

Broadway
Lopez graduated from Manhattan's High School of Performing Arts, where she majored in drama; her experiences as a drama student are depicted in the musical A Chorus Line. Had Tiffany's survived, it would have marked her debut on Broadway, but the production was plagued with so many problems that its creative team deemed it impossible to fix. From there, she moved on to Henry, Sweet Henry, which lasted only two months at the end of 1967, when she was 19 years old. Her luck was no better the following year when Her First Roman lasted two weeks.

Lopez achieved critical and popular success as a replacement in two shows: Stephen Sondheim's Company (1970), followed by the 1972 hit Pippin in 1974, taking over the role of Fastrada from original performer Leland Palmer. Two years later, she was invited by director and choreographer Michael Bennett to participate in a series of tape-recorded group therapy-style sessions in which chorus boys and girls, AKA "Gypsies," bared their souls and discussed their lives, dreams and frustrations. From these sessions emerged A Chorus Line (1975), and Lopez was invited to join the cast, portraying Diana Morales, a character patterned after herself. She introduced the hit song "What I Did for Love", and sang "Nothing", a song about a disastrously unsupportive drama class at the High School of Performing Arts.

In A Day in Hollywood / A Night in the Ukraine (1980), Lopez stepped out of the ensemble and into the spotlight, displaying her comedic and vocal skills. The show had two acts, first a mini-musical about the early days of movie making, by Dick Vosburgh and Frank Lazarus with additional material by Jerry Herman, and second a send-up of the slapstick Marx Brothers movies, with Lopez playing Harpo. Both she and the show received rave reviews; it ran nearly a year-and-a-half, and she earned a Tony Award for Best Featured Actress in a Musical. In 1982, Tommy Tune, with whom she had worked in Hollywood/Ukraine, hired her as his assistant on Nine, the musical version of the Federico Fellini film 8½. Midway through the run, she joined the cast taking over for Tony-winner Liliane Montevecchi in the role of Liliane La Fleur.  Lopez also appeared on Broadway in the critically acclaimed play Anna in the Tropics in 2003. From 2008 to 2011, Lopez appeared as Camilla in the Broadway production of In the Heights.  She took over the role of Berthe in the revival of Pippin from Annie Potts on July 22, 2014 through August 31 2014.

Off-Broadway
Her off-Broadway credits include  Other People's Money, Key Exchange, Extremities, The Oldest Profession, Beauty of the Father and Class Mothers '68, for which she was nominated for a Drama Desk Award as Best Actress. She was featured in the City Center Encores! production of Babes in Arms.

Television
Lopez starred as a liberal nun in an unsuccessful Norman Lear series In the Beginning with McLean Stevenson in 1978. She had a guest role on the ABC drama Family, starring Kristy McNichol and Sada Thompson; she played Buddy's (McNichol) dance friend in the disco episodes. In 1983, she was the voice of Herself the Elf in the animated TV special The Magic of Herself the Elf. She had a key role in the short-lived 1986 medical drama Kay O'Brien. In 1993, Lopez starred in the television movie For the Love of My Child: The Anissa Ayala Story, in which she played a mother who, along with her husband, conceives a child to provide a suitable bone-marrow donor for their older daughter. Other television work includes L.A. Law, Law & Order, All in the Family, Trapper John, M.D., Cosby, and B Positive. In 2021, she portrayed Abuela Sofia in the Disney Channel Original Movie, Christmas...Again?!.

Films
She had a brief role in Center Stage, and she appeared in Maid in Manhattan playing the mother of Jennifer Lopez's character, and had a role in the film version of the long-running off-Broadway hit Tony n' Tina's Wedding. She appeared in the film Musical Chairs as the disapproving mother of E.J. Bonilla's character.

Awards and nominations
Awards
 1976 Obie Award - A Chorus Line 1976 Theatre World Special Award Ensemble Performance Award - A Chorus Line 1980 Tony Award for Best Featured Actress in a Musical - A Day in Hollywood / A Night in the Ukraine	
 2002 Rita Moreno HOLA Award for Excellence from the Hispanic Organization of Latin Actors.

Nominations
 1976 Tony Award for Best Featured Actress in a Musical - A Chorus Line''

Personal life
Lopez is married to Vincent Fanuele; they have two children, Alex and Gabriella.

References

External links
 
 
 

1948 births
Living people
American female dancers
American dancers
American women singers
American film actresses
American musical theatre actresses
American television actresses
Drama Desk Award winners
American actresses of Puerto Rican descent
Obie Award recipients
Entertainers from the Bronx
Theatre World Award winners
Tony Award winners
Fiorello H. LaGuardia High School alumni
Dancers from New York (state)